Cuestión de peso is an Argentine reality show that features a number of overweight people and tracks their daily attempts to reduce their weight. It is produced by Endemol and aired by El Trece. It was hosted from 2006 to 2008 by Andrea Politti, and by Claribel Medina from 2010 to modern day. The format was bought by Chile, Paraguay and Spain.

Season 1 (2006)

Contestants 

Health education television series
El Trece original programming
Argentine reality television series
2006 Argentine television series debuts